Sarawut Jomkamsing is a professional footballer from Thailand. He currently plays for Rajnavy Rayong in the Thailand Premier League.

Notes

External links
Rajnavy Rayond Squad

Living people
Sarawut Jomkamsing
1984 births
Association football defenders
Sarawut Jomkamsing
Sarawut Jomkamsing